Phi Delta Theta Fraternity House may refer to:

Phi Delta Theta Fraternity House (Champaign, Illinois), listed on the U.S. National Register of Historic Places (NRHP)
Phi Delta Theta Fraternity House (Lincoln, Nebraska), listed on the NRHP

See also
Phi Delta Theta